A list of films produced in Egypt in 1970. For an A-Z list of films currently on Wikipedia, see :Category:Egyptian films.

External links
 Egyptian films of 1970 at the Internet Movie Database
 Egyptian films of 1970 elCinema.com

Lists of Egyptian films by year
1970 in Egypt
Lists of 1970 films by country or language